Dejan Žigon (born 30 March 1989) is a Slovenian footballer who plays for Brian Lignano Calcio.

Career
In June 2019, Žigon joined Italian Serie D club ASD Cjarlins Muzane. He left the club at the end of the year, after signing a pre-contract with Italian Eccellenza club Brian Lignano Calcio in December 2019.

References

External links
NZS profile 

1989 births
Living people
People from Šempeter pri Gorici
Slovenian footballers
Slovenia youth international footballers
Association football midfielders
ND Gorica players
Olimpia Grudziądz players
A.C. Belluno 1905 players
NK Bela Krajina players
A.S.D. Barletta 1922 players
Slovenian PrvaLiga players
Slovenian Second League players
I liga players
Serie D players
Serie C players
Eccellenza players
Slovenian expatriate footballers
Slovenian expatriate sportspeople in Italy
Expatriate footballers in Italy
Slovenian expatriate sportspeople in Poland
Expatriate footballers in Poland